Aurora Golden Gala (cultivar 8S6923) is a cross between the apples 'Splendour' and 'Gala'. It was named in 2003 in a nationwide "Name the Apple" contest. Aurora Golden Gala is a yellow dessert apple. It is harvested mid-season. The fruit are medium in size, very crisp, juicy, aromatic, sweet, and they store well.

Currently Aurora Golden Gala is only available in Canada and the United States. The cultivar was made at the Pacific Agri-Food Research Centre (PARC), Summerland, BC.

References

 

Dessert apples
Apple cultivars